Hexagrammia is a genus of trematodes in the family Opecoelidae.

Species
Hexagrammia longitestis Schell, 1973
Hexagrammia zhukovi Baeva, 1965

References

Opecoelidae
Trematode genera